Nayelly Hernández (born 23 February 1986) is a former Mexican professional squash player. She has represented Mexico internationally in several international competitions including the Central American and Caribbean Games, Pan American Games, Women's World Team Squash Championships. Nayelly achieved her highest career ranking of 57 in October 2011 during the 2011 PSA World Tour. Her husband Chris Walker whose nationality is English is also a professional squash player. She joined the Trinity College in 2008 as the first Mexican female to join a US college for squash and graduated in 2010.

Career 
Nayelly joined PSA in 2006 and took part in the PSA World Tour until 2016, the 2015-16 PSA World Tour was her last World Tour prior to the retirement.

Nayelly Hernandez represented Mexico at the 2007 Pan American Games and claimed a bronze medal as a part of the team event on her maiden appearance at the Pan American Games. In the 2011 Pan American Games she clinched gold in the women's doubles event along with Samantha Teran and settled for bronze in the team event. She has also participated at the Women's World Team Squash Championships on four occasions in 2010, 2012, 2014 and in 2016.

References 

Living people
Mexican female squash players
Squash players at the 2007 Pan American Games
Squash players at the 2011 Pan American Games
Central American and Caribbean Games gold medalists for Mexico
Pan American Games gold medalists for Mexico
Pan American Games bronze medalists for Mexico
People from San Luis Potosí City
Trinity College (Connecticut) alumni
1986 births
Pan American Games medalists in squash
Central American and Caribbean Games medalists in squash
Competitors at the 2006 Central American and Caribbean Games
Medalists at the 2011 Pan American Games
21st-century Mexican women